Baragaon or Badagaon is a census village and panchayat of Masauli Block in Barabanki district in the state of Uttar Pradesh, India.

Geography

See also
 Qidwai

References

Villages in Barabanki district